Calathus oertzeni is a species of ground beetle from the Platyninae subfamily that is endemic to Crete.

References

oertzeni
Beetles described in 1988
Beetles of Europe
Endemic arthropods of Crete